Rambla Just Oliveras is a Barcelona Metro station, in the L'Hospitalet de Llobregat municipality of the Barcelona metropolitan area, and named after the nearby street of Rambla Just Oliveras. The station is served by line L1, and is adjacent to the L'Hospitalet de Llobregat railway station, the main Rodalies Barcelona and mid-distance transport hub in the area.

The station is located under Rambla Just Oliveras between the Carrer de Parral and Avinguda de Can Serra. It can be accessed from entrances on the Rambla Just Oliveras, on the Avinguda de Can Serra and adjacent to the entrance to the mainline station on the Carrer dels Alps.

The station opened in 1987, when line L1 was extended from Torrassa station to Avinguda Carrilet station.

See also
List of Barcelona Metro stations
Transport in L'Hospitalet de Llobregat

References

External links
TMB.net

Barcelona Metro line 1 stations
Railway stations in Spain opened in 1987
Railway stations in L'Hospitalet de Llobregat